League of Zenica-Doboj Canton is a fourth level league in the Bosnia and Herzegovina football league system. The league champion is promoted to the Second League of the Federation of Bosnia and Herzegovina - Center.

Member clubs
List of clubs competing in 2020–21 season: 

 FK Borac Tetovo
 NK Čelik Zenica
 NK Fortuna Zenica
 NK Napredak Šije
 NK Nemila
 NK Novi Šeher
 NK Proleter Makljenovac
 NK Sporting Zenica
 NK Vareš
 NK Žepče

References

4
Bos